No Way Home is a 1996 American crime drama film written and directed by Buddy Giovinazzo.

Plot
Joey (Tim Roth) was convicted of killing a shop-owner during a botched burglary and serves a six years sentence. His prison term leaves Joey with many mental and physical scars due to assaults he suffered.

Upon release, Joey is determined to never go back to prison. He seeks out his elder brother, Tommy (James Russo), and meets his new wife Lorraine (Deborah Kara Unger), a beautiful blonde who is initially distrustful of Joey. Joey discovers that Tommy has gotten involved with drug dealing. Meanwhile, Lorraine and Joey develop a special relationship.

Cast
 Tim Roth as Joey Larabito
 James Russo as Tommy Larabito
 Deborah Kara Unger as Lorraine Larabito
 Joseph Ragno as Ralphie
 Catherine Kellner as Denise
 Saul Stein as Brick

Reception
Ken Eisner of Variety critiqued the film, writing that the film "is both too bleak and too familiar to spark much mainstream interest" while also praising Tim Roth and Deborah Kara Unger. Meanwhile, The Guardian wrote that the title, "No Way Home", should be "No Big Deal" as it may describe it better.

Legacy
In 2020, the Fantasia International Film Festival premiered a 4K Restoration of the film. The restoration was done by Severin Films.

References

External links

1996 films
1996 crime drama films
American crime drama films
1990s English-language films
1990s American films